This article details the fixtures and results of the UAE national football team in 1980. 

The UAE made their first appearance at the Asian Cup finals but failed to get out of the Group Stages. It was also the first time that the national team had faced opposition outside of West Asia.

Schedule

1980 AFC Asian Cup

1980 AFC Asian Cup

1980 AFC Asian Cup

1980 AFC Asian Cup

National team
National team
1980
United